LEEP Online Education is a distance learning program offered by the UIUC iSchool (formerly GSLIS [Graduate School of Library and Information Science]) at the University of Illinois at Urbana-Champaign.

The LEEP program provides students who are not able to relocate to the Urbana-Champaign area a means to attend the university's ALA-accredited Master of Library and Information Science, Master of Information Science or Certificate of Advanced Study (CAS) program. The program, and the iSchool overall, is ranked #1 by U.S. News & World Report.

History

The acronym LEEP originally stood for Library Education Experimental Program. Founded in 1995, the program is no longer considered experimental.

Coursework
LEEP differentiates itself from other distance learning library and information science (LIS) programs through the integration of brief periods of on-campus participation, Internet instruction through synchronous sessions, and independent learning. Off-campus students attend classes via the school's Moodle Virtual Learning Environment (VIS) and the Blackboard Collaborate platform. With the 21st LEEP cohort, beginning in the summer/fall of 2016, the on-campus participation was condensed to a weekend program (as opposed to a week+).

References

External links
LEEP Online Education

Information schools
Distance education institutions based in the United States
University of Illinois Urbana-Champaign